In late modern continental philosophy, neo-Kantianism was a revival of the 18th-century philosophy of Immanuel Kant. The Neo-Kantians sought to develop and clarify Kant's theories, particularly his concept of the "thing-in-itself" and his moral philosophy.

It was influenced by Arthur Schopenhauer's critique of the Kantian philosophy in his work The World as Will and Representation (1818), as well as by other post-Kantian philosophers such as Jakob Friedrich Fries and Johann Friedrich Herbart.

Origins 
The "back to Kant" movement began in the 1860s, as a reaction to the German materialist controversy in the 1850s.

In addition to the work of Hermann von Helmholtz and Eduard Zeller, early fruits of the movement were Kuno Fischer's works on Kant and Friedrich Albert Lange's History of Materialism (Geschichte des Materialismus, 1873–75), the latter of which argued that transcendental idealism superseded the historic struggle between material idealism and mechanistic materialism. Fischer was earlier involved in a dispute with the Aristotelian idealist Friedrich Adolf Trendelenburg concerning the interpretation of the results of the Transcendental Aesthetic, a dispute that prompted Hermann Cohen's 1871 seminal work Kants Theorie der Erfahrung (Kant's Theory of Experience), a book often regarded as the foundation of 20th-century neo-Kantianism. It is in reference to the Fischer–Trendelenburg debate and Cohen's work that Hans Vaihinger started his massive commentary on the Critique of Pure Reason.

Varieties 
Hermann Cohen became the leader of the Marburg School (centered in the town of the same name), the other prominent representatives of which were Paul Natorp and Ernst Cassirer.

Another important group, the Southwest (German) School (also known as the Heidelberg School or Baden School, centered in Heidelberg, Baden in Southwest Germany) included Wilhelm Windelband, Heinrich Rickert and Ernst Troeltsch.  The Marburg School emphasized epistemology and philosophical logic, whereas the Southwest school emphasized issues of culture and value theory (notably the fact–value distinction).

A third group, mainly represented by Leonard Nelson, established the neo-Friesian School (named after post-Kantian philosopher Jakob Friedrich Fries) which emphasized philosophy of science.

The neo-Kantian schools tended to emphasize scientific readings of Kant, often downplaying the role of intuition in favour of concepts. However, the ethical aspects of neo-Kantian thought often drew them within the orbit of socialism, and they had an important influence on Austromarxism and the revisionism of Eduard Bernstein. Lange and Cohen in particular were keen on this connection between Kantian thought and socialism. Another important aspect of the neo-Kantian movement was its attempt to promote a revised notion of Judaism, particularly in Cohen's seminal work, one of the few works of the movement available in English translation.

The neo-Kantian school was of importance in devising a division of philosophy that has had durable influence well beyond Germany. It made early use of terms such as epistemology and upheld its prominence over ontology. Natorp had a decisive influence on the history of phenomenology and is often credited with leading Edmund Husserl to adopt the vocabulary of transcendental idealism. Emil Lask was influenced by Edmund Husserl's work, and himself exerted a remarkable influence on the young Martin Heidegger. The debate between Cassirer and Heidegger over the interpretation of Kant led the latter to formulate reasons for viewing Kant as a forerunner of phenomenology; this view was disputed in important respects by Eugen Fink. An abiding achievement of the neo-Kantians was the founding of the journal Kant-Studien, which still survives today.

By 1933 (after the rise of Nazism), the various neo-Kantian circles in Germany had dispersed.

Further influence 
The Neo-Kantian movement had a significant impact on the development of 20th-century philosophy, particularly in the areas of epistemology, metaphysics, and ethics. It continues to be an important influence on contemporary philosophy, particularly in the fields of social and political philosophy.

Notable neo-Kantian philosophers

Eduard Zeller (1814–1908)
Charles Bernard Renouvier (1815–1903)
Hermann Lotze (1817–1881)
Hermann von Helmholtz (1821–1894)
Kuno Fischer (1824–1907)
Friedrich Albert Lange (1828–1875)
Wilhelm Dilthey (1833–1911)
African Spir (1837–1890)
Otto Liebmann (1840–1912)
Hermann Cohen (1842–1918)
Alois Riehl (1844–1924)
Wilhelm Windelband (1848–1915)
Johannes Volkelt (1848–1930)
Benno Erdmann (1851–1921)
Hans Vaihinger (1852–1933)
Paul Natorp (1854–1924)
Émile Meyerson (1859–1933)
Karl Vorländer (1860–1928)
Heinrich Rickert (1863–1936)
Ernst Troeltsch (1865–1923)
Jonas Cohn (1869–1947)
Robert Reininger (1869–1955)
Ernst Cassirer (1874–1945)
Emil Lask (1875–1915)
Richard Honigswald (1875–1947)
Bruno Bauch (1877–1942)
Leonard Nelson (1882–1927)
Nicolai Hartmann (1882–1950)
Hans Kelsen (1881–1973)

Related thinkers

Robert Adamson (1852–1902)
Henri Poincaré (1854–1912)
Georg Simmel (1858–1918)
Max Weber (1864–1920)
José Ortega y Gasset (1883–1955)
György Lukács (1885–1971)
Hermann Weyl (1885–1955)

Contemporary neo-Kantianism
In the analytic tradition, the revival of interest in the work of Kant that has been underway since Peter Strawson's work The Bounds of Sense (1966) can also be viewed as effectively neo-Kantian, not least due to its continuing emphasis on epistemology at the expense of ontology. Around the same time as Strawson, Wilfrid Sellars also renewed interest in Kant's philosophy. His project of introducing a Kantian turn in contemporary analytic philosophy has been taken up by his student Robert Brandom. Brandom's work has transformed Sellars' project to introducing a Hegelian phase in analytic philosophy. In the 1980s, interest in neo-Kantianism has revived in the wake of the work of Gillian Rose, who is a critic of this movement's influence on modern philosophy, and because of its influence on the work of Max Weber. The Kantian concern for the limits of perception strongly influenced the antipositivist sociological movement in late 19th-century Germany, particularly in the work of Georg Simmel (Simmel's question 'What is society?' is a direct allusion to Kant's own: 'What is nature'?). The current work of Michael Friedman is explicitly neo-Kantian.

Continental philosophers drawing on the Kantian understandings of the transcendental include Jean-François Lyotard and Jean-Luc Nancy.

Classical conservative thinker Roger Scruton has been greatly influenced by Kantian ethics and aesthetics.

See also
 German idealism
 North American Kant Society

Notes

References
Sebastian Luft (ed.), The Neo-Kantian Reader, Routledge, 2015.

Further reading
Frederick C. Beiser (2014), The Genesis of Neo-Kantianism, 1796-1880 (Oxford: Oxford University Press)
Hermann Cohen (1919), Religion of Reason Out of the Sources of Modern Judaism (1978, trans. New York)
Harry van der Linden (1988), Kantian Ethics and Socialism (Hackett Publishing Company: Indianapolis and Cambridge)
Thomas Mormann; Mikhail Katz. Infinitesimals as an issue of neo-Kantian philosophy of science. HOPOS: The Journal of the International Society for the History of Philosophy of Science 3 (2013), no. 2, 236-280. See https://www.jstor.org/stable/10.1086/671348 and https://arxiv.org/abs/1304.1027.
Gillian Rose (1981), Hegel Contra Sociology (Athlone: London)
Arthur Schopenhauer (1818), The World as Will and Representation (1969, trans. Dover: New York)

External links
 
 Neo-Kantianism article in the Internet Encyclopedia of Philosophy

Kantianism